Roberto Néstor Sensini (born 12 October 1966) is an Argentine football manager and former player, who played as a centre-back or defensive midfielder. As a player with the Argentina national team, he won both the 1991 and 1993 Copa América, also finishing in third place in the 1989 edition of the tournament. He also represented his nation in the 1990, 1994, and 1998 FIFA World Cup finals, finishing in second place at the 1990 World Cup. Furthermore, he won an Olympic silver medal with Argentina at the 1996 Olympics.

Club career

His professional playing career started in 1986 for Newell's Old Boys; where he won his first title before relocating to Italy in 1989, joining Udinese Calcio alongside compatriot Abel Balbo. Sensini played four seasons for the bianconeri, before moving to Parma in 1993, where he remained for a further six seasons. During this period Sensini sometimes played in midfield and won two UEFA Cups, two Italian Cups, and the UEFA Super Cup with the gialloblu, also reaching the final of the European Cup Winners' Cup in 1994. He would then have a brief stint with S.S. Lazio starting from the 1999–2000 season, winning the scudetto, the Italian Cup, the UEFA Super Cup, and the Supercoppa Italiana in his first season. After two years with the club, he moved back to Parma for a further year, winning another Coppa Italia in 2002, before returning to his first Italian club, Udinese, in 2002.

In 2005, he was one of the most consistent performers in Udinese's surprise qualification for the UEFA Champions League. Sensini was one of the oldest players of the 2005–06 Serie A, holding even the record as the oldest foreign player to score a goal in first division, at the age of 39 years, two months and 26 days. With over 380 matches at the top level, he was considered one of the most experienced defenders of the Italian league, and often nicknamed nonno (grandfather) by Italian sports journalists. He retired at the end of the season.

International career
"Boquita" Sensini debuted for his national team in 1987, and played his last match in 2000. He played in the World Cup 1990, 1994 and 1998. In the 1990 FIFA World Cup Final Sensini conceded the disputed penalty kick from which West Germany scored their winning goal. He helped his country to a third-place finish at the 1989 Copa América, and he was also part of the championship teams in the 1991 Copa América and 1993 Copa América tournaments.

He was part of the Argentina under-23 squad that won the silver medal at the 1996 Summer Olympics in Atlanta, as one of the three overage players allowed per squad.

Career statistics

Club
Source:

Style of play
Sensini was a consistent, decisive, and intelligent player. He was also extremely tactically versatile, and was capable of playing in any defensive or midfield position. Throughout his career, he was deployed as a full-back, an attacking wing-back, a centre-back, or even as a central or defensive midfielder. Although he primarily excelled defensively as a ball winner, due to his marking and tackling ability, as well as his tough, aggressive, and physical playing style, he was also a player with good technique, who was capable of making attacking runs and contributing offensively for his team with occasional goals. Considered one of the best players of the 1990s and 2000s.

Management career
On 10 February 2006, after the dismissal of Serse Cosmi, Sensini ended his playing career and was appointed Udinese's new manager. He was supported in his new position by Loris Dominissini, who was named co-coach. The following month when Dominissini was sacked, Sensini resigned and left the club. Results had not improved with the team in danger of relegation, while they were defeated in the UEFA Cup by Bulgarian team Levski Sofia.

For the Argentine Torneo Clausura 2008, Sensini coached Estudiantes de La Plata, having replaced Diego Simeone. Sensini then went to manage Newell's Old Boys for the Clausura 2009 tournament. In April 2011, he resigned after two years as head coach of Newell's Old Boys after Lepra's sixth loss in nine games, leaving them 19th in the Clausura table.

On 21 February 2012, Sensini was appointed as the new head coach of Argentine first division club Colón. He resigned on 16 March 2013 after a 1–0 loss against rivals San Lorenzo, following a row of eight matches without winning.

Personal life
In 1996 Sensini took Italian citizenship. He is an Italian Argentine, whose grandfather Pacifico Sensini emigrated from Macerata to Rosario, Santa Fe in 1911.

Managerial statistics

Honours

Club
Newell's Old Boys
Argentine Primera División: 1987–88

Parma
Coppa Italia: 1998–99, 2001–02
UEFA Cup: 1994–95, 1998–99
UEFA Super Cup: 1993Lazio'''
Serie A: 1999–2000
Coppa Italia: 1999–2000
Supercoppa Italiana: 2000
UEFA Super Cup: 1999

References

External links
 Serie A Profile 
 Statistics at zanaiball.it
 
  Managerial statistics in the Argentine Primera
  It is finally official

1966 births
Living people
People from Rosario Department
Argentine people of Italian descent
Argentine footballers
Argentine football managers
Citizens of Italy through descent
Argentine emigrants to Italy
Newell's Old Boys footballers
Parma Calcio 1913 players
S.S. Lazio players
Udinese Calcio players
Serie A players
Serie B players
Udinese Calcio managers
Serie A managers
Olympic footballers of Argentina
Olympic silver medalists for Argentina
Footballers at the 1996 Summer Olympics
1990 FIFA World Cup players
1994 FIFA World Cup players
1998 FIFA World Cup players
1989 Copa América players
Association football central defenders
Argentina international footballers
Estudiantes de La Plata managers
Atlético de Rafaela managers
Expatriate football managers in Chile
Chilean Primera División managers
Everton de Viña del Mar managers
Argentine expatriate sportspeople in Chile
Argentine Primera División players
Argentine expatriate footballers
Expatriate footballers in Italy
Argentine expatriate sportspeople in Italy
Olympic medalists in football
Medalists at the 1996 Summer Olympics
UEFA Cup winning players
Sportspeople from Santa Fe Province